Josephine Paige Groves (born 5 September 2004) is an English cricketer who currently plays for Northamptonshire and The Blaze. She plays as a right-arm leg break bowler.

Domestic career
Groves made her county debut in 2019, for Northamptonshire against Cambridgeshire and Huntingdonshire. She took 5 wickets for her side in the Twenty20 Cup that season, at an average of 15.20. She again took 5 wickets for Northamptonshire in the 2021 Women's Twenty20 Cup, including best figures of 3/14 taken against Derbyshire. She took seven wickets for the side in the 2022 Women's Twenty20 Cup, at an average of 11.42.

Groves was named as part of the Lightning Academy for the 2021 season, and took 4/19 for the side in a match against Central Sparks Academy. She was added to the full squad in August 2021, and made her debut for the side on 10 September, against South East Stars in the Rachael Heyhoe Flint Trophy. She went on to play eight matches for Lightning in 2022, across the Charlotte Edwards Cup and the Rachael Heyhoe Flint Trophy, taking eight wickets. She also scored her maiden half-century, against Southern Vipers in the Rachael Heyhoe Flint Trophy, scoring 55 from 39 deliveries. In February 2023, it was announced that Groves had signed her first professional contract with Lightning, now known as The Blaze.

International career
In October 2022, Groves was selected in the England Under-19 squad for the 2023 ICC Under-19 Women's T20 World Cup. She played five matches in the tournament, taking three wickets at an average of 18.00.

References

External links

2004 births
Living people
People from Milton Keynes
Northamptonshire women cricketers
The Blaze women's cricketers